Saara Elisa Niemi,  (born 1 January 1986) is a Finnish retired ice hockey player and current general manager and head coach of HIFK Naiset of the Naisten Liiga (NSML). She was an alternate captain for Finland's women's ice hockey team at the 2010 Winter Olympics in Vancouver where the Finns won the bronze medal.

She graduated in 2010 from the University of Minnesota Duluth (UMD) and was a two-year captain of the Minnesota Duluth Bulldogs, the NCAA Division I national champions in 2008 and 2010. She was a 2009 and 2010 WCHA All-Academic Team member, a 2008 All-WCHA Third Team selection and a member of the 2007 All-WCHA Rookie Team.

Playing career
After graduation, she joined the Minnesota Whitecaps for their 2010–11 season. On 8 October, against former WCHA rival Minnesota Golden Gophers, Tuominen scored a goal. The following day, against former WCHA rival St. Cloud State, she scored a goal.

Career statistics

Awards and honors
 2006 Naisten SM-sarja Best Forward
 2008 All-WCHA Third Team
 2021 Naisten Liiga Coach of the Year

Gallery

References

External links
 
 
 

1986 births
Living people
People from Ylöjärvi
Finnish ice hockey coaches
Naisten Liiga (ice hockey) coaches
Finnish women's ice hockey forwards
HIFK Naiset players
Ilves Naiset players
Minnesota Duluth Bulldogs women's ice hockey players
Minnesota Whitecaps players
Ice hockey players at the 2006 Winter Olympics
Ice hockey players at the 2010 Winter Olympics
Olympic bronze medalists for Finland
Olympic ice hockey players of Finland
Olympic medalists in ice hockey
Medalists at the 2010 Winter Olympics
Universiade medalists in ice hockey
Universiade silver medalists for Finland
Competitors at the 2011 Winter Universiade
Women ice hockey executives
Finnish ice hockey administrators
Sportspeople from Pirkanmaa